JYP Entertainment  is a South Korean entertainment company established in 1997 by J. Y. Park. The company operates as a record label, talent agency, music production company, event management and concert production company, and music publishing house. It is currently one of the largest entertainment companies in South Korea.

The label is home to prominent K-pop artists such as J. Y. Park, 2PM, Day6, Twice, Bernard Park, Stray Kids, Boy Story, Itzy, NiziU, Xdinary Heroes, and NMIXX, and formerly home to artists like Rain, G.O.D, Wonder Girls, 2AM, Miss A, Baek A-yeon, 15&, and Got7.

This is the list of JYP Entertainment discography from 2000 and after.

2000s

2000–2005

2006

2007

2008

2009

2010s

2010

2011

2012

2013

2014

2015

2016

2017

2018

2019

2020s

2020

2021

2022

2023

See also 
 Studio J discography

References

External links 
 

JYP Entertainment
Pop music discographies
Discographies of South Korean record labels